We Are Not Angels ( / Mi nismo anđeli) is a 1992 Serbian and Yugoslavian comedy movie directed by Srđan Dragojević that became one of the most popular films of the 1990s in the region of the former Yugoslavia.  The plot revolves around Angel (played by Uroš Đurić) and Devil (Srđan Todorović) fighting for the soul of Belgrade playboy Nikola (Nikola Kojo) who is unaware that he impregnated a high school student named Marina (Milena Pavlović) during a drunken one-night stand.

The film was lauded by critics for its inventive direction, tight editing, urban humour and its large number of pop culture references. Its commercial success and later cult status, however, could be at least partially attributed to specific circumstances at the time of the film's premiere. Namely, before the film reached theatres, the Federal Republic of Yugoslavia was put under UN sanctions, thus depriving local theatres of Hollywood blockbusters. Many Yugoslavian films filled that void and had great commercial success, including We Are Not Angels. However, Yugoslavian movies were anyway the most popular in Yugoslavia (both SFRJ and FRJ).

Characters 
 Nikola Milojević (Nikola Kojo), a Belgrade playboy who has slept with almost every girl in town. He is a 20-year-old literature student, and lives with his friend Marta. He has one problem: due to his regular morning hangovers he can never remember the girl he slept with the night before. Marina's pregnancy makes Nikola insecure and frightened, but he finally falls in love with Marina. They get a baby girl, named Sofija.
 Marina (Milena Pavlović), an 18-year-old honor student. Nikola is the first guy she's slept with, but she gets pregnant. She decides to keep the baby, and falls in love with Nikola, wanting him all for herself. Her friend Buba has many plans of how to do it, and Marina's not always all right with her plans but still carries through with them. At the end of the movie, Marina gives a birth to a beautiful baby girl, Sofija.
 Ljubinka "Buba" Prodanović (Branka Katić), Marina's best friend, an 18-year-old pupil of the High School of Beauty Care. She is the world's biggest fan of Barbara Sidney (a fictional author), and also the author of the book The most famous playboys of Belgrade. Buba tries to get Marina and Nikola together, basing her plans on Barbara Sidney's novels. She is helped by Raca, who she constantly spurns until the end of the movie.
 Devil (Srđan Todorović) and Angel (Uroš Đurić), the two spirits overlooking Nikola, playing a game - if Nikola falls in love with Marina and takes care of their baby, Angel wins, while if he refuses to take responsibility, Devil wins.

Production
The movie was shot during fall 1991 using the production capabilities of Avala Film. The making of the movie coincided with the beginning stages of the disintegration of SFR Yugoslavia that included continual ethnically motivated incidents in the breakaway constituent republic of SR Croatia that culminated in the Battle of Vukovar.

Since the Yugoslav People's Army (JNA) was involved in the above conflict, it was conscripting young men for battle thus many of the film's male crew members including director Dragojević received military call-ups. According to Dragojević, in order to avoid the draft, they resorted to sleeping in different apartments most nights during the movie's shooting.

Release and reception
The film was lauded by critics for its inventive direction, tight editing, urban humour and its large number of pop culture references. Its commercial success and later cult status, however, could be at least partially attributed to specific circumstances at the time of the film's premiere. Namely, before the film reached theatres, the Federal Republic of Yugoslavia was put under UN sanctions, thus depriving local theatres of Hollywood blockbusters. Many Serbian films filled that void and had great commercial success, including We Are Not Angels. In 1996, the members of the Yugoslavian Board of the Academy of Film Art and Science (AFUN) voted this film the ninth best Serbian movie in the 1947–1995 period.

Sequels

We Are Not Angels 2 (2005) 
Break-through role of Mirka Vasiljević who became a teen idol.

We Are Not Angels 3: Rockenroll Strikes Back (2006)

See also
List of Yugoslavian films

References

External links
 

1992 films
1990s Serbian-language films
Serbian comedy films
Films directed by Srđan Dragojević
Socialist Republic of Serbia
Films set in Serbia
1992 in Serbia
1992 comedy films
The Devil in film
Films shot in Serbia
Culture in Belgrade
1992 directorial debut films
Films set in Belgrade
Films shot in Belgrade